Pradeep Yadav (born 7 May 1975), is a Nepali politician and a member of the Federal Parliament of Nepal since 2017. Yadav is currently serving as the Minister of Forests and Environment in the ruling coalition led by Prime Minister and Nepali Congress President Sher Bahadur Deuba.

In the 2017 general election, he was elected from the Parsa 1 constituency.

In the 2022 Nepalese general election, he was elected from Parsa 1 (constituency).

Controversies
In 2019, Yadav was sacked from his party for 6 months for participating in a free Tibet meeting in Europe.

References

Nepal MPs 2017–2022
Living people
Madhesi Jana Adhikar Forum, Nepal politicians
Rastriya Prajatantra Party politicians
People's Socialist Party, Nepal politicians
1975 births
Nepal MPs 2022–present